Strefford is a historic hamlet in Shropshire, England.

The nearest settlement is Upper Affcot, to the north on the A49, a hamlet which has a public house.

Strefford was recorded in the Domesday Book as 'Straford' and in 1255 as 'Streford'. The name derives from its situation between the Roman road (a "Street") at Wistanstow (to the west) and the ford immediately to the east of the hamlet, which crosses the Byne or Quinny Brook. The Byne and Quinny Brooks meet just prior to the ford and only a mile after flow into the River Onny.

There is a farm shop and bed and breakfast at Strefford Hall.

Strefford Conservation Area covers all the settlement, including the ford. There are five Listed buildings in the hamlet: Ford Cottage, Malt Cottage, The Cottage, the (disused) parish pumphouse, and Strefford Cottages; in addition there is a Listed milestone on the A49 road at Strefford. The village lies within the Shropshire Hills Area of Outstanding Natural Beauty designation.

See also
Listed buildings in Wistanstow

References

Hamlets in Shropshire